This is a list of electoral results for the Electoral district of Tullamarine in Victorian state elections.

Members for Tullamarine

Election results

Elections in the 1990s

References

Victoria (Australia) state electoral results by district